The New Hanseatic League, or the Hansa, also called the Hanseatic League 2.0, was established in February 2018 by European Union finance ministers from Denmark, Estonia, Finland, Ireland, Latvia, Lithuania, the Netherlands and Sweden through the signing of a two-page foundational document that set out the "shared views and values in the discussion on the architecture of the Economic and Monetary Union of the European Union (EMU)". The name is derived from the Hanseatic League, a Northern European commercial and defensive league which lasted until the 16th century.

The grouping sees clubbing together as a way to make up for the loss of the like-minded United Kingdom in the European political arena after Brexit. The countries involved want a more developed European single market, particularly in the services sector (i.e. a so-called 'Capital Markets Union'). They also want to develop the European Stability Mechanism into a full European Monetary Fund that would redistribute wealth from trade surplus to trade deficit EU member states. A number of think tanks – including Free Trade Europa - support this policy approach.

In a speech delivered in the Netherlands, Ireland's Tánaiste (deputy head of government) Simon Coveney suggested cooperation among the countries in the alliance could extend to foreign policy as well, such as the Middle East peace process and the EU's relations with Africa. Some have expressed fears the New Hanseatic League could exacerbate existing north–south political divides in Europe by grouping northern European countries too closely. A more recent fiscally conservative group of EU nations exists in an informal setting, dubbed the Frugal Four. It consists of some of the New Hanseatic League member states plus Austria.

In November 2018, the New Hanseatic group called for the European Stability Mechanism to be given a greater role in scrutinising state budgets. Under the plan, formal tests of a state government's debt sustainability and ability to repay would be carried out before aid could be provided. The call came after the European Commission's rejection of Italy's 2019 budget, and was signed by all eight members of the League, along with two additional signatures from the Czech Republic and Slovakia.

See also
 Baltic Assembly
 Benelux
 Craiova Group
 EU Med Group
 Frugal Four
 Hanseatic League
 Oslo Agreements, 1930
 Three Seas Initiative
 Visegrád Group

References

Hanseatic League
Budget of the European Union
European Union
Foreign relations of Denmark
Foreign relations of Estonia
Foreign relations of Finland
Foreign relations of Ireland
Foreign relations of Latvia
Foreign relations of Lithuania
Foreign relations of the Netherlands
Foreign relations of Sweden
International organizations based in Europe
Bottom-up regional groups within the European Union